The tornado outbreak of May 22–27, 2008 affected much of the central United States and parts of Canada. A total of 173 tornadoes touched down as a result of the outbreak. Several large and destructive tornadoes occurred, including in Windsor, Colorado, Quinter, Kansas, Hugo, Minnesota and Parkersburg, Iowa. The Parkersburg tornado was rated an EF5 on the Enhanced Fujita Scale with winds of 205 mph. Nine people were killed in Iowa, two in Kansas and one in each Minnesota and Colorado.

Confirmed tornadoes

Note: Three tornadoes in Canada were rated according to the Fujita scale, but are included in the chart below using their corresponding number rating.

May 22 event

May 23 event

May 24 event

May 25 event

May 26 event

May 27 event

See also

 Tornadoes of 2008
 List of Mid-May 2008 tornado outbreak sequence tornadoes
 List of EF5 tornadoes

Notes

References

External links
 Slideshow of tornado damage in Weld County, CO (Courtesy of KCNC)
 Slideshow of aerial damage of Hugo, Minnesota tornado (Courtesy of WCCO)
 2008 Tornado (Waterloo-Cedar Falls The Courier special section)
 Video of May 30 Kansas and Nebraska tornadoes (NBC News)

Tornadoes of 2008
F5 tornadoes
May 2008 events in North America
Tornadoes in Ontario
Tornadoes in the United States
2008 disasters in Canada
2008 natural disasters in the United States
2008-05-26